Ectoedemia mesoloba is a moth of the family Nepticulidae. It is found in Florida, United States.

The length of the forewings is about 2.7 mm. Adults have been collected in November.

External links
New Leaf-Mining Moths of the Family Nepticulidae from Florida

Nepticulidae
Moths of North America
Moths described in 1978